The Coventry Deanery is a Roman Catholic Deanery in the Roman Catholic Archdiocese of Birmingham. Comprising fifteen parishes in the City of Coventry (together with chaplaincy's to both the University of Warwick and University Hospital Coventry), it is part of the Southern pastoral area.

Key personnel
As of 2016, the area bishop is the Rt Rev William Kenney and the area dean is Canon Tom Farrell.

Parishes

See also
 Rugby Deanery

References

External links
Deaneries of the Archdiocese of Birmingham
Archdiocese of Birmingham
Coventry Catholic Deanery
All Souls' Parish Website
Christ the King's Parish Website
Corpus Christi's Parish Website
Holy Family's Parish Website
Sacred Heart's Parish Website
St. Elizabeth's Parish Website
St. John Vianney's Parish Website
St. Mary and St Benedict's Parish Website
St. Thomas More's Parish Website

Christianity in Birmingham, West Midlands
Roman Catholic deaneries in the Archdiocese of Birmingham